Ernest A. Heden (February 12, 1888 – 1962), was a member of the Wisconsin State Assembly and Wisconsin State Senate. Heden was Lutheran.

Background
Born on Ogema, Wisconsin, Heden graduated from Gustavus Adolphus College. He was in the banking and logging business. His father was August Heden who also served in the Wisconsin Legislature.

Career
In 1934, Heden was a candidate in the Republican primary for the United States House of Representatives from Wisconsin's 10th congressional district. He lost to incumbent Hubert H. Peavey, who then lost to Bernard J. Gehrmann in the general election. From 1939 to 1943, he was a member of the Assembly. He was later a delegate to the Republican National Convention in 1940 and 1944 before serving in the Senate from 1945 to 1947.

References

People from Ogema, Wisconsin
Gustavus Adolphus College alumni
Businesspeople from Wisconsin
Republican Party Wisconsin state senators
Republican Party members of the Wisconsin State Assembly
1888 births
1962 deaths
20th-century American politicians